Rembert Church, also known as Rembert Methodist Church, is a historic Methodist church located near Woodrow, Lee County, South Carolina. It was built about 1835, and is a plain meeting house style rectangular building with clapboard siding.   The adjacent cemetery was established in 1800. It is one of the earliest Methodist congregations in South Carolina, with a Methodist Society meeting as early as 1785.  In its early days it was frequently visited by Francis Asbury, the first Bishop of the Methodist Church of the United States.

It was added to the National Register of Historic Places in 1975.

References

Methodist churches in South Carolina
Churches on the National Register of Historic Places in South Carolina
Churches completed in 1835
19th-century Methodist church buildings in the United States
Churches in Lee County, South Carolina
National Register of Historic Places in Lee County, South Carolina